The following is a list of French billionaires is based on an annual assessment of wealth and assets compiled and published by Forbes magazine in 2021, according to Forbes list of billionaires.

2021 Forbes List

See also
List of French people
Lists of people by nationality
Forbes list of billionaires
List of billionaires

References

External links
 Forbes Rich List 
 Challenges

Lists of people by wealth
 
Net worth
Lists of French people